Francisco Romero Robledo (8 March 1838, in Antequera, Spain – 3 March 1906, in Madrid, Spain) was a Spanish politician who served as Minister of Development in 1872, Minister of Governance several times from 1874 to 1879, 1879 to 1881 and 1884 to 1885, Minister of Overseas from 1891 to 1892 and Minister of Grace and Justice in 1895.

References

1838 births
1906 deaths
Public works ministers of Spain
Interior ministers of Spain
Justice ministers of Spain